The County of Wetaskiwin No. 10 is a municipal district in central Alberta, Canada that is south of Edmonton. Located in Census Division No. 11, its municipal office is in located in the City of Wetaskiwin.

Geography

Communities and localities 
The following urban municipalities are surrounded by the County of Wetaskiwin No. 10.
Cities
Wetaskiwin
Towns
Millet
Villages
none
Summer villages
Argentia Beach
Crystal Springs
Grandview
Ma-Me-O Beach
Norris Beach
Poplar Bay
Silver Beach

The following hamlets are located within the County of Wetaskiwin No. 10.
Hamlets
Alder Flats
Buck Lake
Falun
Gwynne
Mulhurst Bay
Village at Pigeon Lake
Westerose
Winfield

The following localities are located within the County of Wetaskiwin No. 10.
Localities 

Aspen Acres
Battle Lake
Beachside Estates
Bevan Estates
Brightview
Curilane Beach
Diana
Fairview Heights
Fraspur
Ganske
Grandview Heights
Knob Hill
Lakeland Estates
Lakeside Country Estates
Lansdowne Park
Larch Tree Park
Malmo
Maywood Bay
Maywood Subdivision
Modest Creek Estates

Mullen Dalf
Norbuck
Nordic Place
Patience
Peace Hills Heights
Peace Hills Park
Pendryl
Pineridge Downs
Pipestone
Prestone Village
Springtree Park
Texaco Bonnie Glen Camp
Thompson Subdivision
Town Lake
Usona
Viola Beach
Wenham Valley
Willowhaven Estates
Wizard Heights
Yeoford

Demographics 

In the 2016 census conducted by Statistics Canada, the County of Wetaskiwin No. 10 had a population of 11,181 living in 4,372 of its 5,556 total private dwellings, a  change from its 2011 population of 10,866.

See also 
List of communities in Alberta
List of municipal districts in Alberta

References

External links 

 
Wetaskiwin